The Oriental Limited was a named passenger train that ran between Chicago, Illinois and Seattle, Washington.  The train was operated by the Great Northern Railway  between St. Paul, Minnesota and Seattle, Washington, and by the Chicago, Burlington and Quincy Railroad between St. Paul and Chicago.  The train's name was intended to be evocative of travel to the Far East and Japan, since trans-Pacific Great Northern steamships once connected with the railway's trains in Seattle.

The Oriental Limited started in December 1905 as a St. Paul–Seattle train; the route was extended to Chicago in 1909. In summer 1926 it was scheduled Chicago to Seattle in 70 hours.

It was the premiere train on its route until 1929 when the Empire Builder started.  The Oriental Limited name disappeared in 1931, and during the Great Depression and beyond the Great Northern operated only one through train between Chicago and the coast.  The Oriental Limited name returned in 1946, when the railroad's secondary through train was resumed, but that train became the Western Star in 1951.

Gallery

References

Dubin, Arthur D.  Some Classic Trains. Milwaukee:  Kalmbach Publishing Co., 1964.  .
Hidy, Ralph W., et al.  The Great Northern Railway:  A History. Minneapolis:  University of Minnesota Press, 2004.  .

Passenger trains of the Great Northern Railway (U.S.)
Named passenger trains of the United States
Railway services introduced in 1905
Railway services discontinued in 1951